The Grays River is a tributary of the Tekapo River in the Mackenzie Basin of New Zealand.

It should not be confused with the Gray River, a small tributary of the Awatere River in Marlborough, nor with the much larger Grey River on the South Island's West Coast.

References

Rivers of Canterbury, New Zealand
Rivers of New Zealand